Poggio San Marcello is a comune (municipality) in the Province of Ancona in the Italian region Marche, located about  southwest of Ancona.

Poggio San Marcello borders the following municipalities: Belvedere Ostrense, Castelplanio, Montecarotto, Rosora.

References

Cities and towns in the Marche